The Minister of Industry and Commerce is a former cabinet position in the province of Manitoba, Canada.

The department's origins can be traced back to 1932, when John Stewart McDiarmid was appointed as minister of Mines and Natural Resources, and for Industry. The department was renamed as "Industry and Commerce" in 1940.

The position was eliminated in 1978, and its responsibilities dispersed among other departments.

List of Ministers of Industry and Commerce

References 

McDiarmid was styled as Minister of Industry until November 4, 1940.

Industry and Commerce, Minister of